The Cathedral of the Blessed Virgin Mary is the Cathedral of the Roman Catholic Diocese of Hamilton, New Zealand. It was opened in 1975, replacing an earlier Neo-Classical building known as St Mary's Church which was built in 1911–1912. The Cathedral of the Blessed Virgin Mary was dedicated and renamed on 27 April 1980 and rededicated, following refurbishment, on 7 November 2008.

The Cathedral is particularly celebrated for a large stained glass window depicting the Resurrection of Christ. This was in the earlier St Mary's Church and was then placed in the rebuilt St Mary's church in 1975 and remained in place when that church was dedicated as the Cathedral. "The steeple-like effect of this central window and bold cross above is a Hamilton landmark and it remains firmly in place in the remodelled cathedral, offering beauty and a sense of history". This Resurrection window has been associated with Hamilton's "church on the hill" for more than 50 years. It was made for the early Church of Our Lady of the Rosary in the 1950s, by Dutch immigrant artist Martin (Martinus Wouterous) Roestenburg who lived and worked in Taihape.

Mass Times  
There are four masses celebrated each weekend at the Cathedral. These are:
 Saturday evening, 6:00PM (vigil mass), 
 Sunday morning, 7:30AM 
 Sunday morning, 10:30AM
 Sunday evening at 6:00PM 

There are generally nine masses held on weekdays at the Cathedral. These are:
 Monday 8:00AM
 Tuesday 8:00AM and 12:05PM
 Wednesday 8:00AM and 12:05PM
 Thursday 8:00AM and 12:05PM
 Friday 8:00AM and 12:05PM

Notes

Roman Catholic cathedrals in New Zealand
1911 establishments in New Zealand
1975 establishments in New Zealand
20th-century Roman Catholic church buildings in New Zealand
Roman Catholic churches completed in 1975
Roman Catholic churches completed in 2008
1975 in New Zealand
Churches in Hamilton, New Zealand
1970s architecture in New Zealand
Roman Catholic Diocese of Hamilton, New Zealand